Yeamans is a surname. Notable people with the surname include:

Annie Yeamans (1835–1912), American actress
John Yeamans (1611–1674), English colonial administrator
Robert Yeamans (died 1643), English merchant
Jennie Yeamans (1862–1906), Australian-born child actress and singer

See also
Yeaman